The Other Me is a 2016 Greek crime film directed by Sotiris Tsafoulias. The theater release was stopped after suspicions arose that a murder of a taxi driver may have been inspired by the film.

Plot 
Inspired by Pythagoras' amicable numbers (Greek: φίλιοι αριθμοί), a serial killer uses the number 220 as their mark, accompanied by quotes of Pythagoras. After two consecutive murders, the police hires young criminologist and lecturer Dimitris Lainis to help with the cases. Albeit plagued by his father's health issues, he takes the case. After a series of events, Dimitris discovers that a suicide incident and a fatal accident prior to the two murders reported by the police are linked to the murders, since the number 220 and quotes of Pythagoras appear in all four cases. A police officer working with Dimitris later states that all of the victims happened to participate in a trial, regarding the death of  Kleio Rapti (Κλειώ ραπτή). Kleio Rapti died after she and her boyfriend were hit by a car, eight years ago. The driver of the car was put on trial for drunk driving but he was found innocent. Young Kleio died, whilst her boyfriend survived. After attending a lecture on mathematics by French mathematician Marcel de Chaffe, Dimitris learns about "eteros ego" (έτερος εγώ - English: the other me): a formula known by the pythagoreans regarding amicable numbers, numbers so related that the sum of the proper dividers of each, is equal to the other number. Such pair is 220 and 284. This information proved to be very useful, as it is later on reported, that Kleio Rapti was wearing an amulet with the number 284 carved on it. At the end, Dimitris successfully solves the case as he finds out that the murderer is Kleio's best friend Danae, who owns another amulet similar to Kleio's with the number 220 on it. The protagonist chooses not to turn her in since he is not sure whether her actions were ethical or not.

Cast 
 Pigmalion Dadakaridis as Professor Dimitris Lainis
 Dimitris Kataleifos as Aristotelis Adamantinos
 Manos Vakousis as Apostolos Barassopoulos
 Ioanna Kolliopoulou as Sofia
 François Cluzet as Marcel de Chaffe
 Kora Karvouni as Danae
 Giorgos Chrysostomou as Manthos Kozoros
 Anna Kalaitzidou as Clio Rapti

References

External links 

2016 crime films
Greek crime drama films
2010s Greek-language films
Films shot in Athens